The Colorado Mammoth are a box lacrosse team playing in the National Lacrosse League. The Mammoth have played at Ball Arena in Denver, Colorado, since the 2003 season. They are owned by Stan Kroenke, who is also the owner of the Colorado Avalanche, Denver Nuggets and the Colorado Rapids of MLS.

The Mammoth franchise previously played as the Baltimore Thunder from 1987 to 1999, the Pittsburgh CrosseFire in 2000, and the Washington Power from 2001 to 2002. Up until the joining of the expansion team San Diego Seals, Colorado was the only non-Canadian team in the Western Division from 2014 to 2018. They have only missed the playoffs once since moving to Colorado.

In 2004 and from 2006 to 2008, the Mammoth lead the league in attendance. 2006 was the first year in the 20-year history of the NLL that the league had an attendance of more than one million fans in one season. The Mammoth had the honor of hosting fan number one million. In 2008, the Mammoth average attendance per game was higher than Pepsi Center's other teams, the Colorado Avalanche (NHL) and the Denver Nuggets (NBA).

2006 champions
In the 2006 season, the Mammoth went to the playoffs in the #2 seed in the Western Division.  Round one was hosted in Colorado against rivals Calgary.  The Mammoth won 18–17 in overtime.  Brian Langtry scored the overtime goal.  Round two (Western Division finals) was also hosted at Pepsi Center against the Arizona Sting.  Rookie Dan Carey scored the winning goal as the Mammoth defeated the Sting 13–12.  The championship game was held at HSBC Arena in Buffalo against the Bandits who held the league's best record and the incumbent league MVP, goaltender Steve Dietrich . The Mammoth won the Champion's Cup by a score of 16–9, with Gavin Prout being named Game MVP.

2022 champions
The Mammoth won the National Lacrosse League Cup beating the Buffalo Bandits 2 games to 1, with Dillon Ward being named the Finals MVP.

Notable players
Gary Gait, who retired after the 2005 NLL season as the NLL's all-time scoring leader with 596 goals and 495 assists in 174 games (a record since surpassed by John Tavares). Gait also won the 2003 NLL MVP Award while with the Mammoth. On November 12, 2005, Gait was inducted into the NLL Hall of Fame, and on December 30, 2005, his number 22 jersey banner was hung from Pepsi Center rafters — the first NLL number ever to be retired and hung from any arena. Gait was the Mammoth head coach for the 2006 and 2007 seasons before stepping down in August 2007 to pursue other interests.
Brian Langtry, who won the NLL Rookie of the Year Award in 2003, is well known for his all-out goal scoring attempts. Langtry retired after the 2011 season.
Gord "Gee" Nash, who was the 2004 Goaltender of the Year.
Gavin Prout, a crowd favorite who consistently puts up high numbers. In 2006, Prout was named team captain. On October 31, 2009, to the outrage of many fans, Prout was traded to the Rochester Knighthawks, who in turn traded him to the Edmonton Rush on November 10. After a season and a half in Edmonton, Prout was traded back to the Mammoth in March 2011.
John Grant Jr., who was the 2012 NLL MVP. Retired in 2017.
Joey Cupido, three time fan favorite award winner who was the 2015 and 2018 Transition Player of the Year.

Awards and honors

NLL Hall of Fame members
 Pat Coyle (Class of 2014)
 Dan Stroup (Class of 2010)
 Gary Gait (Class of 2006)
 Paul Gait (Class of 2006)

Current roster

All-time record

Playoff results

Head coaching history

See also
 Colorado Mammoth seasons

References

External links
 Official Website
 Colorado Mammoth news

 
Sports teams in Denver
Lacrosse clubs established in 2002
Lacrosse teams in Colorado
National Lacrosse League teams
2003 establishments in Colorado
Kroenke Sports & Entertainment